Bohumil Durdis (1 March 1903, in Prague – 16 March 1983, in Copenhagen, Denmark) was a Czech weightlifter who competed for Czechoslovakia in the 1924 Summer Olympics. In 1924 he won the bronze medal in the lightweight class.

References

External links
profile

1903 births
1983 deaths
Czech male weightlifters
Czechoslovak male weightlifters
Olympic weightlifters of Czechoslovakia
Weightlifters at the 1924 Summer Olympics
Olympic bronze medalists for Czechoslovakia
Olympic medalists in weightlifting
Medalists at the 1924 Summer Olympics
Sportspeople from Prague